Freeland is a census-designated place in Tittabawassee Township, Saginaw County in the U.S. state of Michigan. It is part of the Saginaw-Midland-Bay Metropolitan Area. As of the 2000 census, the CDP population was 5,147.  The CDP covers an area in the central portion of Tittabawassee Township. The Freeland post office, ZIP code 48623, serves nearly the entire township, as well as portions of Midland and Williams townships to the north, Frankenlust and Kochville townships to the east, Thomas and Richland townships to the south, and Ingersoll Township to the west.

It is the location of MBS International Airport, which serves three major nearby cities: Saginaw, Bay City and Midland.

It is also the location of the Saginaw Correctional Facility, which is a level I, II and IV maximum security prison.

History
The place was home to Native Americans long before the arrival of European settlers. In the 1819 Treaty of Saginaw, in which the Chippewa, Ottawa, and Pottawatomi ceded a large portion of land including Saginaw County to the United States federal government. In that treaty, within the ceded territory, several tracts were reserved for specific  groups of Chippewa.

In the 1850s, lumbering outposts developed in the area, one of which was called "Loretta", which was given a post office named "Jay" in April 1856. The office was named for the first postmaster, Jefferson Jaqruth. This outpost was very nearly at the geographical center of Tittawabasse Township. Another settlement was placed just a little to the north. in 1867, one resident of the second locale, George Truesdale, instigated moving the post office from Loretta to his settlement, which retained the name of Jay for several years afterwards.

The name of Freeland comes from "Mammy Freeland" who operated a popular tavern on the river, frequented by lumbermen and rivermen, who came to refer to the entire settlement as Freeland. The name of the post office was changed to Freeland in January 1879. It was also a station on the Pere Marquette Railroad. By another account (Moore), the Freeland family name was prominent in business and politics of the area.

During World War II, the airport now known as MBS international was used to hold German and Japanese prisoners of war.

Geography

Notable people
Aleda E. Lutz, WWII Army Flight Nurse, second most decorated woman in U.S. history.

Demographics

2000 Census
As of the census of 2000, there were 5,147 people, 1,441 households, and 1,115 families residing in the CDP. The racial makeup of the CDP was 82.86% White, 13.04% African American, 0.64% Native American, 0.49% Asian, 0.06% Pacific Islander, 0.82% from other races, and 2.10% from two or more races. Hispanic or Latino of any race were 3.17% of the population.

There were 1,441 households, out of which 40.8% had children under the age of 18 living with them, 65.4% were married couples living together, 9.0% had a female householder with no husband present, and 22.6% were non-families. 18.5% of all households were made up of individuals, and 5.6% had someone living alone who was 65 years of age or older.  The average household size was 2.68 and the average family size was 3.08.

In the CDP, the population was spread out, with 22.1% under the age of 18, 7.9% from 18 to 24, 43.3% from 25 to 44, 20.3% from 45 to 64, and 6.4% who were 65 years of age or older.  The median age was 34 years. For every 100 females, there were 161.1 males.  For every 100 females age 18 and over, there were 182.6 males.

The median income for a household in the CDP was $55,455, and the median income for a family was $67,083. Males had a median income of $50,225 versus $33,306 for females. The per capita income for the CDP was $20,470.  About 2.7% of families and 2.6% of the population were below the poverty line, including 2.0% of those under age 18 and 6.5% of those age 65 or over.

Climate
This climatic region is typified by large seasonal temperature differences, with warm to hot (and often humid) summers and cold (sometimes severely cold) winters.  According to the Köppen Climate Classification system, Freeland has a humid continental climate, abbreviated "Dfb" on climate maps.

Transportation 
The main highway running through Freeland is M-47, which goes northbound to US-10, and southbound towards Thomas Township, Michigan, and Saginaw, Michigan

References

External links
Saginaw Correctional Facility
Miller Empey Room

Unincorporated communities in Saginaw County, Michigan
Census-designated places in Michigan
Unincorporated communities in Michigan
Census-designated places in Saginaw County, Michigan